Surzyki may refer to the following places in Poland:

Surzyki Małe
Surzyki Wielkie